McHenry County College (MCC) is a public community college in McHenry County, Illinois. The college serves residents residing in Community College District 528, which covers most of McHenry County and portions of surrounding counties. The college is located along U.S. Route 14, on the northwest side of Crystal Lake, Illinois. There are also secondary facilities in Woodstock and McHenry. Some classes are also taught at area high schools, public libraries, local businesses, and other off-campus locations.  It enrolls about 7,000 students in career programs, transfer programs, GED and adult basic education, non-credit and career development, and training for businesses.

History
MCC was established on April 1, 1967, as part of the Illinois community college system. In September 1968 classes were held for the first time for 312 full-time and 1045 part-time students at a rented oil company in Crystal Lake. In 1974 construction began on new facilities at its present 68-acre site, known at the time as Weber Farm. The school began some classes at the new facility in September 1975, and the move was complete by May 1976. MCC continued to grow, both in land area and student population.

Today, MCC employs approximately 700 full and part time employees with 90% of staff holding master's or doctorate degrees.

Athletics
The MCCScots compete in 8 intercollegiate sports through their membership in the Illinois Skyway Conference within the National Junior College Athletic Association (NJCAA), Division II. For men, this includes baseball, basketball, soccer and tennis. For women, basketball, softball, tennis, and volleyball. Their mascot is a lion named Roary and their colors are gold and purple.

References

External links
Official website

Community colleges in Illinois
Education in McHenry County, Illinois
Buildings and structures in McHenry County, Illinois
Educational institutions established in 1967
Crystal Lake, Illinois
NJCAA athletics
1967 establishments in Illinois